Indian Ports Association is a statutory and autonomous body registered under the Societies Registration Act and constituted in 1966 to foster growth and development of  major ports which are under Ministry of Ports, Shipping and Waterways (MoPSW), Government of India.

History and Objective 

The Indian Ports Association was formed in 1966 for controlling the operation of 12 major ports. It works under the supervison of Ministry of Shipping and was formed with the objective of undertaking research related to planning and organisation, fixing wages of staff working in the 12 ports and making efforts on promoting technical and economic situations relating to ports.

The organisation also acts as an integration of national and international organisations forming part of port and harbour organisations, port management allied activities and liaises between the Ministry of Shipping, ports, and other agencies related to Government. One of the main objectives of the organisation is to promote uniformity and standardise the functions in ports.

Mr. A Janardhana Rao is the current president of the Indian Ports Association.

Related Articles 
List of Ports in India

References

External links 
 Official Website

Non-profit organisations based in India